The Six Days of Hasselt was a six-day track cycling race held annually in Hasselt, Belgium.

Winners

References

Cycle races in Belgium
Six-day races
Recurring sporting events established in 2006
Recurring sporting events disestablished in 2009
2006 establishments in Belgium
2009 disestablishments in Belgium
Defunct cycling races in Belgium